Warrill View is a rural town and locality in the Scenic Rim Region, Queensland, Australia.

Geography 
Warrill View is located in the Fassifern Valley farming area. The Cunningham Highway passes through Warrill View.
Warrill Creek is a tributary of the Bremer River.

History

The town was called Normanby from about 1859 to 1931. However, that caused confusion with another town called Normanby on the road from Ipswich to Harrisville, resulting in this town being renamed Warrill View, a name that was already in use for the school and post office. The name Warrill comes from the name of the local creek, whose name is allegedly an Aboriginal word meaning water or stream.

Warrill View State School opened on 15 September 1910.

At the  the locality recorded a population of 321.

Heritage listings
Warrill View has a number of heritage-listed sites, including:
 Cunningham Highway: Normanby Homestead

Education 
Warrill View State School is a government primary (Prep-6) school for boys and girls at Cunningham Highway. In 2017, the school had an enrolment of 11 students with 6 teachers (2 full-time equivalent) and 5 non-teaching staff (3 full-time equivalent).

Street in Warrill View 

 Audley St
 Bath St
 Cunningham Hwy
 Harsant Rd
 Ipswich St
 Old Rosevale Rd
 Rosewood Warrill View Rd
 Service Rd
 Stapylton Rd
 Warrill View Peak Crossing Rd
 Warwick St
 Willmotts Rd

References

External links

 

Towns in Queensland
Scenic Rim Region
Localities in Queensland